Paulo "Paulinho" Villas Boas de Almeida, commonly known in Brazil as Paulinho Villas Boas (born 26 January 1963), is a Brazilian former professional basketball player.

Career
During his pro club career, Villas Boas won 4 Brazilian Championships, in the years 1983, 1987, 1992, and 1995. With the senior men's Brazilian national basketball team, Villas Boas competed at the 1986 FIBA World Cup, the 1988 Summer Olympic Games, the 1992 Summer Olympic Games, and the 1994 FIBA World Cup.

References

External links
 
FIBA Profile 1
FIBA Profile 2
FIBA Profile 3

1963 births
Living people
Basketball players at the 1988 Summer Olympics
Basketball players at the 1992 Summer Olympics
Brazilian men's basketball players
Centers (basketball)
Clube Atlético Monte Líbano basketball players
Esporte Clube Sírio basketball players
Flamengo basketball players
Mogi das Cruzes Basquete players
Olympic basketball players of Brazil
Sport Club Corinthians Paulista basketball players
Basketball players from São Paulo
Sociedade Esportiva Palmeiras basketball players
1986 FIBA World Championship players
1994 FIBA World Championship players